Jorge Núñez may refer to:
 Jorge Núñez (singer), American Idol season 8 contestant
 Jorge Núñez (athlete), Spanish Paralympic athlete
 Jorge Núñez (footballer, born 1978), Paraguayan football left-back
 Jorge Núñez (footballer, born 1984), Paraguayan football midfielder
 Jorge Sebastián Núñez (born 1986), former Argentine football player
 Jorge Nunez (football coach), Brazilian football coach